Ruslan Vartanov (born 18 August 1971) is a retired Lithuanian Greco-Roman wrestler and coach. He is a fifteen-time Lithuanian Champion in several weight classes and won the Baltic Sea Games in 1993. Vartanov competed at the 1996 Summer Olympics in Atlanta. He is currently one of the coaches of the Lithuanian national Greco-Roman wrestling team. In 2002, he graduated from the Lithuanian University of Educational Sciences.

References

1971 births
Living people
Sportspeople from Vilnius
Armenian wrestlers
Lithuanian male sport wrestlers
Wrestlers at the 1996 Summer Olympics
Olympic wrestlers of Lithuania
Lithuanian wrestling coaches
Lithuanian people of Armenian descent
Lithuanian University of Educational Sciences alumni